Steffensen's inequality is an equation in mathematics named after Johan Frederik Steffensen.  

It is an integral inequality in real analysis, stating: 
 If ƒ : [a, b] → R is a non-negative, monotonically decreasing, integrable function 
 and g : [a, b] → [0, 1] is another integrable function, then

where

References

External links
 

inequalities
real analysis